Allen William Seaby  (25 May 1867 – 28 July 1953) Is best known as an ornithological painter and printmaker, and Professor of Fine Art at the University of Reading. He was the author of several art books for students, and also wrote and illustrated books for children.

Life
Allen W. Seaby was a student at Reading School of Art under Frank Morley Fletcher, where he developed a lifelong passion for colour woodblock printing in the Japanese style. Published on a range of subjects, including art history and technique as well as children’s literature, Seaby taught fine art at the University of Reading for many years, eventually becoming a professor and head of department. Among his students were Kathleen Hale, the creator of Orlando the Marmalade Cat: A Camping Holiday (1938) and its sequels, and C.H. Chapman, who went on to take over the drawing of Billy Bunter.

Seaby’s illustrations are well-known to post-war British children through his watercolours for two Ladybird books on British birds by Brian Vesey-Fitzgerald: British Birds and their Nests (1953) and A Second Book of British Birds and their Nests (1954).

Allen W. Seaby was the grandfather of noted wildlife illustrator and printmaker, Robert Gillmor.

Pony stories

Seaby was an early exponent of the pony story for children, as Alison Haymonds points out:

Seaby’s pony books were published between 1923 and 1949, and like many other interwar writers on equine themes, he produced both fiction and factual material. Seaby’s pony books typically depict the life stories of native ponies, and are frequently episodic, with incidents such as the round up, or time in the circus being typical scenarios between the foal’s birth on a mountain or moorland and old age. Where Seaby differs from most interwar pony story writers is in his perspective as a naturalist, observing the ponies’ behaviour, as compared to the more usual point of view which has the ponies being brought on as children’s riding ponies. As Seaby comments, in the foreword to British Ponies: Running Wild and Ridden (1936):

Seaby wrote and illustrated six fiction titles about native ponies in their habitats between 1923 and 1948. Skewbald: The New Forest Pony (1923) and Sons of Skewbald (1937) are set in the New Forest. First published in 1928, Exmoor Lass contains six short stories exploring the lives of five of Britain’s native pony breeds: the Exmoor, the Shetland, the New Forest, the Dartmoor and the Welsh. Dinah: The Dartmoor Pony (1935) is perhaps the most similar of Seaby’s novels to the typical formulaic pony story: separated from her dam as a foal, Dinah finds her way onto a farm where twelve-year-old Dolly looks after her, eventually breaking her in, before winning two red rosettes in a local gymkhana. Sheltie: The Story of a Shetland Pony (1939) describes a young riding school owner's attempt to ride home from the Highlands to the South of England, leading Sheltie. Mona: The Welsh Pony (1948), set along the Mawddach estuary near Abermaw (Barmouth) and in the hills to the north, tells Mona’s story from her birth on her native moorland, through her breaking-in and usage, and into older age.

Non-fiction pony books

Two non-fiction titles were published in 1936 and 1949. The first, British Ponies: Running Wild and Ridden (1936), is a large format hardback book of drawings, and the second a paperback Puffin picture book, entitled Our Ponies (1949).

Historical fiction for children

In addition to bird illustrations and pony books, Seaby also produced a number of historical books for children, which all demonstrate an underlying interest in archaeology, art history and landscape, as well as ponies. Omrig and Nerla (1934), for example, is set in the Bronze Age, and the novel opens with what is for Seaby quite familiar territory: herd behaviour, a challenge from a lone stallion and the birth of a foal.

Art history and technique

For students, Seaby produced a series on art history, and practical technique books relating to the art of the woodcut, for which he is most well-known. Reviewing the first in Seaby’s series of books for art students, Art in the Life of Mankind (1928 onwards), in The Art Bulletin, Marguerite Wencelius noted a synthesis of ‘both idealistic feeling and scientific qualities of objectivity, clearness and precision’ (1929: 222). Seaby's Japanese-style woodblock print of Stonehenge is particularly striking.

Reputation
Seaby’s obituary in The Times (30 July 1953: 8) paid tribute above all to his ability to synthesise art and nature: his "studies of wildlife", the writer noted, are significant for the way in which "naturalistic truth is combined with decorative disposition", and "nobody could fail to be impressed by the illustrations in such books as Skewbald: The New Forest Pony; British Ponies; and The White Buck".  Cathy Sloan concludes in an article for Nature in Art that Seaby's work bridges ‘the gap between fine art and so called "wildlife art"’ (1995: 10). Pierre Gusman admired his woodcuts in the Japanese style, and compared him with John Dickson Batten, William Giles and Sydney Lee in that field.

Bibliography

As author/illustrator 
 (1923) Skewbald: The New Forest Pony. London: A. & C. Black.
 (1925) The Roman Alphabet and its Derivatives. London B.T. Batsford.
 (1928) Art in the Life of Mankind: A Survey of its Achievements from the Earliest Times. Vol. 1. London: B.T. Batsford.
 (1928) Exmoor Lass and Other Pony Stories. London: A. & C. Black.
 (1934) Omrig and Nerla. London: George G. Harrap.
 (1935) Dinah: The Dartmoor Pony. London: A. & C. Black.
 (1936) British Ponies: Running Wild and Ridden. London: A. & C. Black.
 (1937) Sons of Skewbald, or Castor and Pollux. London: A. & C. Black.
 (1939) Sheltie: The Story of a Shetland Pony. London A. & C. Black.
 (1939) The White Buck: A New Forest Story. London: Thomas Nelson & Sons.
 (1940) ‘A Dartmoor Bog’. In Cyril Swinson (ed.) Twenty Animal Stories. London: A. & C. Black. (First published in Exmoor Lass, 1928)
 (1947) Alfred's Jewel. London: George G. Harrap.
 (1948) Mona: The Welsh Pony. London: A. & C. Black.
 (1949) Our Ponies. Harmondsworth: Penguin (Puffin Picture Books).
 (1951) Blondel the Minstrel. London: Harrap.

As illustrator
 Kirkman, F.B. and Jourdain, F.C.R. (1910–1913) The British Bird Book. Vols. 1–4. London: T.C. and E.C. Jack.
 Burnett, M.E. (c. 1919) My First Book of Birds. London: Thomas Nelson.
 Cumming, Primrose (1934) Doney: A Borderland Tale of Ponies and Young People. London: Country Life.
 Vesey-Fitzgerald, Brian (1953) British Birds and their Nests. Loughborough: Wills & Hepworth (Ladybird).
 Vesey-Fitzgerald, Brian (1954) A Second Book of British Birds and their Nests. Loughborough: Wills & Hepworth (Ladybird).

References

 Gillmor, Robert (1998) Afterword to Allen W. Seaby 1867–1953 Studio Exhibition No. 1 (catalogue). Lavenham: The Wildlife Art Gallery.
 –– (1999) Foreword to Allen W. Seaby 1867–1953 Studio Exhibition of Bird Paintings (catalogue). Lavenham: The Wildlife Art Gallery.
 Hale, Kathleen (1938) Orlando the Marmalade Cat: A Camping Holiday. London: Country Life.
 Haymonds, Alison (1996) ‘Pony Books’. In Hunt, Peter (ed.) International Companion Encyclopedia of Children’s Literature. London: Routledge (pp. 360–67).
 –– (2001) ‘Pony Books’. In Watson, Victor (ed.). Cambridge Guide to Children’s Books in English. Cambridge: Cambridge University Press.
 Kendrick, Jenny (2009) ‘Running Wild and Ridden’: A short introduction to native ponies and their wild habitats in the work of Allen W. Seaby (1867–1953). In Deep into Nature: Ecology, Environment & Children's Literature edited by Jennifer Harding, Liz Thiel & Alison Waller (NCRCL/IBBY papers 15), 2009. Lichfield: Pied Piper
 Obituary of Allen W. Seaby. The Times (30 July 1953: p. 8).
 Sloan, Cathy (1995) ‘A.W. Seaby "….a classic tale of Victorian self-improvement"’. Nature in Art, vol. 3, no. 3, (pp.9–10).
 Smith, Sidney and Bott, Michael (1992) One Hundred Years of University Education in Reading: A Pictorial History: 1892–1992. Reading: University of Reading.
 Wencelius, Marguerite (1929) ‘Review: Art in the Life of Mankind by Allen W. Seaby’. The Art Bulletin, vol. 11, no. 2, (pp. 222–23).

External links
 Portrait of Seaby by Harold James Yates (1878–1959)
 
 
 Roy Brigden: The Museum of English Rural Life, Reading
 Kathleen Hale & Allen W. Seaby at the University of Reading
 Deep into Nature: Ecology, Environment & Children's Literature edited by Jennifer Harding, Elizabeth Thiel & Alison Waller (NCRCL/IBBY papers 15) 
Read more about the pony story in the interwar period

19th-century British painters
British male painters
20th-century British painters
British illustrators
Pony books
1867 births
1953 deaths
19th-century British male artists
20th-century British male artists